Lekhahia is a Mesolithic site in Uttar Pradesh, India. It yielded skeletons which are not studied much yet. Some of its findings are pre-microlithic. It is situated in Mirzapur district of UP.

References 

Mirzapur district
Archaeological sites in Uttar Pradesh